The Roman Catholic Diocese of Nuestra Señora de la Altagracia en Higüey (erected 1 April 1959) is a suffragan diocese of the Archdiocese of Santo Domingo.

History
 1 April 1959: created from territory of the  Archdiocese of Santo Domingo
 1 February 1997: lost territory as did the Archdiocese of Santiago de los Caballeros to create the Diocese of San Pedro de Macorís

Bishops

Ordinaries
Juan Félix Pepén y Soliman † (1959 - 1975), became emeritus 
Hugo Eduardo Polanco Brito † (1975 - 1995), Archbishop (personal title), became emeritus
Ramón Benito de La Rosa y Carpio (1995 - 2003), appointed Archbishop of Santiago de los Caballeros
Gregorio Nicanor Peña Rodríguez (2004 - 2020), became emeritus
Jesús Castro Marte (2020 - )

Other priest of this diocese who became bishop
Pablo Cedano Cedano † , appointed Auxiliary Bishop of Santo Domingo in 1996

References

External links

Roman Catholic dioceses in the Dominican Republic
Nuestra Señora de la Altagracia en Higüey
Nuestra Señora de la Altagracia en Higüey
Roman Catholic Ecclesiastical Province of Santo Domingo